SGI Onyx is a series of visualization systems designed and manufactured by SGI, introduced in 1993 and offered in two models, deskside and rackmount, codenamed Eveready and Terminator respectively. The Onyx's basic system architecture is based on the SGI Challenge servers, but with graphics hardware.

The Onyx was employed in early 1995 for development kits used to produce software for the Nintendo 64 and, because the technology was so new, the Onyx was noted as the major factor for the impressively high price of – for such kits.

The Onyx was succeeded by the Onyx2 in 1996 and was discontinued on March 31, 1999.

CPU

The deskside variant can accept one CPU board, and the rackmount variant can take up to six CPU boards. Both models were launched with the IP19 CPU board with one, two, or four MIPS R4400 CPUs, initially with 100 and 150 MHz options and later increased to 200 and 250 MHz. Later, the IP21 CPU board was introduced, with one or two R8000 microprocessors at 75 or 90 MHz; machines with this board were referred to as POWER Onyx. Finally, SGI introduced the IP25 board with one, two, or four R10000 CPUs at 195 MHz.

Graphics
The Onyx was launched with the RealityEngine2 or VTX graphics subsystems, and InfiniteReality was introduced in 1995.

RealityEngine2
The RealityEngine2 is the original high-end graphics subsystem for the Onyx and was found in two different versions: deskside and rack. The deskside model has one GE10 (Geometry Engine) board with 12 Intel i860XP processors, up to four RM4 or RM5 (Raster Manager) boards, and a DG2 (Display Generator) board. The rack model differs by supporting up to three RealityEngine2 pipes (display outputs) vs the single pipe of the deskside.

VTX
The VTX graphics subsystem is a cost reduced version of the RealityEngine2, using the same hardware but in a feature reduced configuration that can not be upgraded. It consists of one GE10 board (6 Intel i860XP processors vs 12 in RE2), a single RM4 or RM5 board, and a DG2 board.

InfiniteReality
InfiniteReality succeeded RealityEngine2 as the high-end graphics subsystem for the Onyx when introduced in 1996. As with RealityEngine2, two versions correspond to the form factors of the Onyx. The deskside version consists of a GE12 board, one or two RM6 boards (limited due to the amount of cooling the deskside system provides), and a DG4 board. The rack model increases the number of RM6 boards supported to four per pipe and allows up to three pipes to be installed resulting in an Onyx rack with a maximum of three GE12 boards, three DG4 boards, and twelve RM6 boards.

References

Further reading
 POWER Onyx and Onyx Deskside Owner's Guide (document number: 007-1733-070).
 POWER Onyx and Onyx Rackmount Owner's Guide (document number: 007-1736-060).

Onyx
Computer-related introductions in 1993
64-bit computers